Manhattan High School is a public high school in Manhattan, Kansas, United States, serving students in grades 9-12. It is part of the Manhattan–Ogden USD 383.  For the 2013–2014 school year, Manhattan High had an enrollment of 1,920 students.

The school is divided into two campuses.  The main building is the West Campus, containing grades 10–12, while the East Campus is for ninth graders. The two campuses are approximately one mile apart. Students use buses to transport between campuses.

As of the most recent ratings in 2017, MHS was listed on the Washington Post'''s list of the nation's "Most Challenging High Schools" for each of the prior nine years. Only twelve high schools in Kansas made that list in 2017.  The school's athletic teams are referred to as the "Indians," and have won more than 45 state championships.  Notable alumni of the school include Fred Andrew Seaton, former U.S. Senator and Secretary of the Interior.

History
The first public schoolhouse in Manhattan was built in 1857, serving all grades.  The first dedicated secondary school in the town opened in 1873 at the current site of the Manhattan High School "East Campus."  The first recorded high school graduation ceremony was held in 1892.

The current East Campus of the school consists of two limestone buildings that are connected by a glass walkway.  The first building – on the far right side in the accompanying photo – was opened in 1914 to replace the earlier secondary school.  (Many histories date the establishment of Manhattan High from the completion of this building in 1914.)  The second building – on the left side of the accompanying photo – was built in 1918 as a separate building for junior high school students (grades 7, 8, and 9).

The West Campus is a red brick building that was constructed in 1956 to be the new high school.  Both of the older buildings (the current East Campus) were then utilized for junior high school students.  Over the next 40 years, the new high school faced recurring overcrowding issues and was significantly expanded, but the new school simply proved unable to keep up with the town's population growth.  After considering and rejecting the idea of building a second high school in Manhattan, in 1996 the town instead built two new middle schools, and moved the ninth grade to the East Campus.

Beginning in 2011, the West Campus underwent a $42.2 million renovation and expansion.  The construction added 14 new classrooms, in addition to a number of other improvements, and supplied a new facade for much of the building.

Campus layout

The West Campus is laid out in five parallel hallways, with an open space between each and a central "commons area."  Each hallway is lettered from south to north.  Classes in the industrial arts are held in a detached building behind the West Campus.  A large greenhouse and a new fitness center are also detached from the main building.  The West Campus houses two gymnasiums; one is used as a general purpose facility and the other is primarily for basketball and volleyball games.

The East Campus is composed of two three-story limestone buildings, connected with a glass walkway and an annex in the rear (not visible in the above photo), built in 1928.  The campus also has a detached gymnasium built behind the main stone buildings.

Academics
Manhattan High School has been listed on several recent compilations of the best high schools in the nation.  MHS was listed on the Washington Posts list of "Most Challenging High Schools" for the past nine years.  Only ten high schools in Kansas made the list in 2017.  MHS was also listed by Newsweek in 2009 and 2010 as one of the top high schools in the U.S.  Only six schools in Kansas made the list in 2009, and five in 2010.  Finally, the school district was awarded a Blue Ribbon in the 2007 Education Quotient Study, ranking it in the top third nationwide.

There are a wide range of learning opportunities offered at MHS, from tutoring for learning-impaired students to dual credit classes at Kansas State University, and a wide range of elective classes.  Currently the school offers electives from performing arts to language arts to physical arts.  Manhattan High is also the hub of a statewide virtual education academy called the iQ Academy Kansas.  The online classes give students the opportunity to study and learn at their own personal pace.  240 students were enrolled in the program as of 2007.

In the 2015–2016 school year there were four National Merit Finalists from Manhattan High.

Extracurricular activities

Athletics
Manhattan High has teams competing in baseball, basketball (boys and girls), bowling (boys and girls), cross country (boys and girls), football, golf (boys and girls), soccer (boys and girls), softball, swimming & diving (boys and girls), tennis (boys and girls), track & field (boys and girls), volleyball (girls), and wrestling.  The school competes at the 6A level (largest schools) in the Centennial League.  Manhattan High has its own stadium, Bishop Stadium, which seats 4,000 spectators and hosts football games and track events.  The football field was changed from grass to artificial turf in 2013.

The school is a member of the Centennial League, which it joined in 2004. MHS was previously a member of the defunct I-70 League from 1978 to 2004, and before that the Central Kansas League (CKL).

The athletics program has received some national recognition. On June 19, 2007, Sports Illustrated published a list of the top high school athletic programs in each state, and Manhattan High School was declared the top high school athletics program in Kansas for 2007.  Also, Manhattan High's football team was nationally ranked in the USA Today poll during the 1987 and 1988 seasons.

Mascot controversy

Manhattan High's sports teams are called the "Indians."  In light of debate over the use of Native American mascots in athletics, the use of the name "Indians" by the high school has been questioned since it was adopted. The mascot name was intended, in part, to honor Frank Prentup, a former football coach of the high school who claimed Indian ancestry.  In 2001, the Unified School District 383 Board of Education voted to retain the mascot name but would restrict how the Indian could be portrayed.

In 2015, there was a renewed push to remove the "Indians" name. The following year the Manhattan-Ogden school board voted 7–0 to keep the "Indians" nickname. In addition to honoring the former coach, the other reasons cited by the board for keeping the mascot involved an estimated cost of $300,000 to replace the mascot amidst state level budget cuts. However, the board voted to form a committee that would explore creating a new mascot, determining the associated costs, and finding methods to fund such a change. Additionally, a greater emphasis would now be placed on Native American education at the school and community levels. The committee would report on its findings to the school board by September 2017.

State championships

^ unofficial; predates KSHSAA playoffs and AP poll
+predates KSHSAA playoffs; ranked #1 in final AP poll

Non-athletic programs

Debate/Forensics
The Manhattan High Debate and Forensics team is ranked among the top schools in the nation by number of degrees by the National Forensics League. Manhattan High has competed at the state in all the NFL events and at the national level in many of the events. It is one of the largest teams by members in the state. The team is coached by Mac Phrommany.

 The debate team won KSHSAA state championships in 1972, 1973, 1984, 1987, 1988, 2004 (2-speaker), 2015 (4-Speaker).
 The forensics team won KSHSAA state championships in 1984, 2008, 2012, 2014, and 2015.

Journalism
Manhattan High School's newspaper, The Mentor, was founded in 1919. It used to be one of the few weekly high school newspapers in Kansas. The paper is printed weekly when school is in session, except on weeks in which students are out one or more days, on the presses of The Manhattan Mercury. More than 1,600 copies are distributed for free to students, staff and community members. In 2011, The Mentor switched from a tabloid newspaper to a broadsheet.

The school's journalism students have won a number of statewide awards in competitions administered by the Kansas Scholastic Press Association, as well as national Quill and Scroll awards.

The first newspaper issued by the school was the Manhattan High School Monitor, in 1873–1874.  It was reported to be the first high school newspaper issued by students in Kansas.

Music
Manhattan High School's marching band, The "Big Blue" Marching Band performs at every home football game, in parades, and in band festivals. The concert band performs during the spring season. There is also a large choir program, which includes mixed choirs, men's and women's choirs, and two show choirs. In addition, there is a jazz ensemble, symphonic band, wind ensemble, and both chamber and symphonic orchestras. Many of these ensembles and their members regularly participate in regional and state solo and ensemble competitions. Ensembles also participate in national competitions such as the Festival of Gold, which the symphonic and chamber orchestras participated in in 2015. An ensemble of volunteer players is used as the pit orchestra for the school musical.

Performing arts
Manhattan High has a drama and stagecraft program. A four performance musical is put on annually in mid-November, showcasing the talent of MHS thespians. Performances take place in the Rezac Auditorium at the West Campus. It has an active performance calendar that includes a fall Broadway musical with full pit orchestra, a Winter Gala featuring large performing groups, a winter play, a spring play, student directed one-act plays, showcase concerts for show choirs and jazz band, as well as the traditional large-group concerts each quarter. Every other year, MHS choirs partake in a music festival at Disney World over spring break. Pops and Varsity show choirs are auditioned ensembles who perform in the community throughout the course of the school year. Each require a combo band, made up of MHS students.

Manhattan High also has dance and competition teams. The dance team performs at home football games, basketball games, and wrestling events, performing halftime routines as well as sidelines (at football games). The competition team, the elite division of dance team, holds tryouts every year. Competition then takes several routines to various regional competitions, including pom, hip-hop, jazz, novelty, solos, and duets. The competition team also performs halftime routines on its own at basketball games. Over the summer, the dance team attends Universal Dance Association (UDA) camp, where they perform various routines.

Notable alumni
 19th century: Samuel Williston, paleontologist (pre-1873)
 19th century: Philip Fox, astronomer
 1916: Clementine Paddleford, food critic and Al Jolley, NFL player
 1923: Frank Morrison, 34th Governor of Nebraska
 1924: Bert Pearson, NFL player
 1926: Solon Kimball, anthropologist
 1927: Fred Seaton, U.S. Senator, Secretary of the Interior
 1930: Kenneth Davis, historian, winner of Francis Parkman Prize
 1930: Joan Finney, 42nd Governor of Kansas
 1939: David Gates, physicist, ecologist, pioneering climatologist
 1939: Virginia Yapp Trotter, U.S. Assistant Secretary of Education 
 1949: Earl Woods, father of Tiger Woods
 1952: Del Close, actor, comedian, one of the premier influences on modern improvisational theater
 1952: Inger Stevens, actress
 1954: Tom Oberheim, inventor of Oberheim synthesizer and DMX drum machine, which defined early hip-hop production
 1961: Robert Woodruff, NASA physicist
 1961: Samina Quraeshi, Pakistani-American artist, author and educator; National Endowment for the Arts Design Director (1994-1997)
 1964: Bill Buzenberg, journalist, executive director of Center for Public Integrity, vice-president of news at NPR
 1972: Dawayne Bailey, musician
 1974: Gary Spani, member of College Football Hall of Fame and Kansas City Chiefs Hall of Fame
 1977: Tim Jankovich, college basketball coach
 1981: Deb Richard, former professional golfer
 1982: Michael Kremer (graduated early in 1981), Nobel laureate, MacArthur Fellows Program "genius grant" recipient
 1982: Anna Seaton, won bronze medal at 1992 Summer Olympics, member of America's Cup crew on the America3
 1983: Craig Colbert, professional baseball player
 1988: Brett Wallerstedt, NFL player
 1989: Thomas Randolph, All-American former football player at Kansas State
 1989: Jim Smallwood, Colorado State Senator
 1990: Bridget Everett, cabaret artist, comedian, actress
 1992: Will Tiao, actor, realtor, and former federal government official
 1993: Steve Balderson, filmmaker
 2003: Tracy Britt Cool, financial advisor
 2008: Jackie Carmichael, basketball player
 2009: Charles Melton, actor
 2012: Deante Burton, NFL player
 2017''': Trevor Hudgins, NBA player

See also
 List of high schools in Kansas
 List of unified school districts in Kansas

References

External links 
 
 MHS Mentor (student newspaper)
 Manhattan High School Alumni Association
 USD 383 School District Boundary Map, KDOT

Educational institutions established in 1873
Public high schools in Kansas
Schools in Riley County, Kansas
Manhattan, Kansas
1873 establishments in Kansas